The Glory Hole is the fourth and final studio album from Scottish band Goodbye Mr Mackenzie, originally released in 1995 and reissued in 1998.

The album was remastered and re-released in 2021 with three bonus tracks and amended tracklist.

Track listing
"Ugly Child"
"Smile"
"Trash It"
"She's Got Eggs"
"Troubling You"
"Space Neurotic"
"Overboard"
"Concrete"
"The Prince of Wales"
"Crewcut"
"House on Fire"
"Neuromental"

2021 Remaster
"Prince of Wales"
"Ugly Child"
"Crewcut"
"Troubling You"
"Space Neurotic"
"Concrete"
"Overboard"
"Smile"
"She's Got Eggs"
"House on Fire"
"Neuromental"
"Stop Watch (Demo)"
"Call Me (Demo)"
"I'm With You (Demo)"

Credits 

 Producer - Goodbye Mr MacKenzie

1995 albums
Goodbye Mr Mackenzie albums
Capitol Records albums
Electronica albums by Scottish artists